The first season of the television series Live PD began airing October 28, 2016, on A&E in the United States. The season concluded on August 19, 2017 and contained 62 episodes including one cancelled episode.

Departments
Departments debuting in season one

Arizona Department of Public Safety
Bridgeport (CT) Police Department
Richland County (SC) Sheriff's Office
Tulsa (OK) Police Department
Utah Highway Patrol/Utah State Bureau of Investigation
Walton County (FL) Sheriff's Office
Warren County (KY) Sheriff's Office
Mission (TX) Police Department
Midland County (TX) Sheriff's Office
Edmonson County (KY) Sheriff's Office

Calvert County (MD) Sheriff's Office
Logan County (KY) Sheriff's Department
St. Tammany Parish (LA) Sheriff's Office
Clark County (IN) Sheriff's Office
Santa Rosa County (FL) Sheriff's Office
Greenville County (SC) Sheriff's Office
Jeffersonville (IN) Police Department
Wakulla County (FL) Sheriff's Office
Spokane County (WA) Sheriff's Office
Lake County (IL) Sheriff's Office

italics indicates a department returned for season two

Episodes

References

Live PD
2016 American television seasons
2017 American television seasons